= SingldOut =

Online dating website

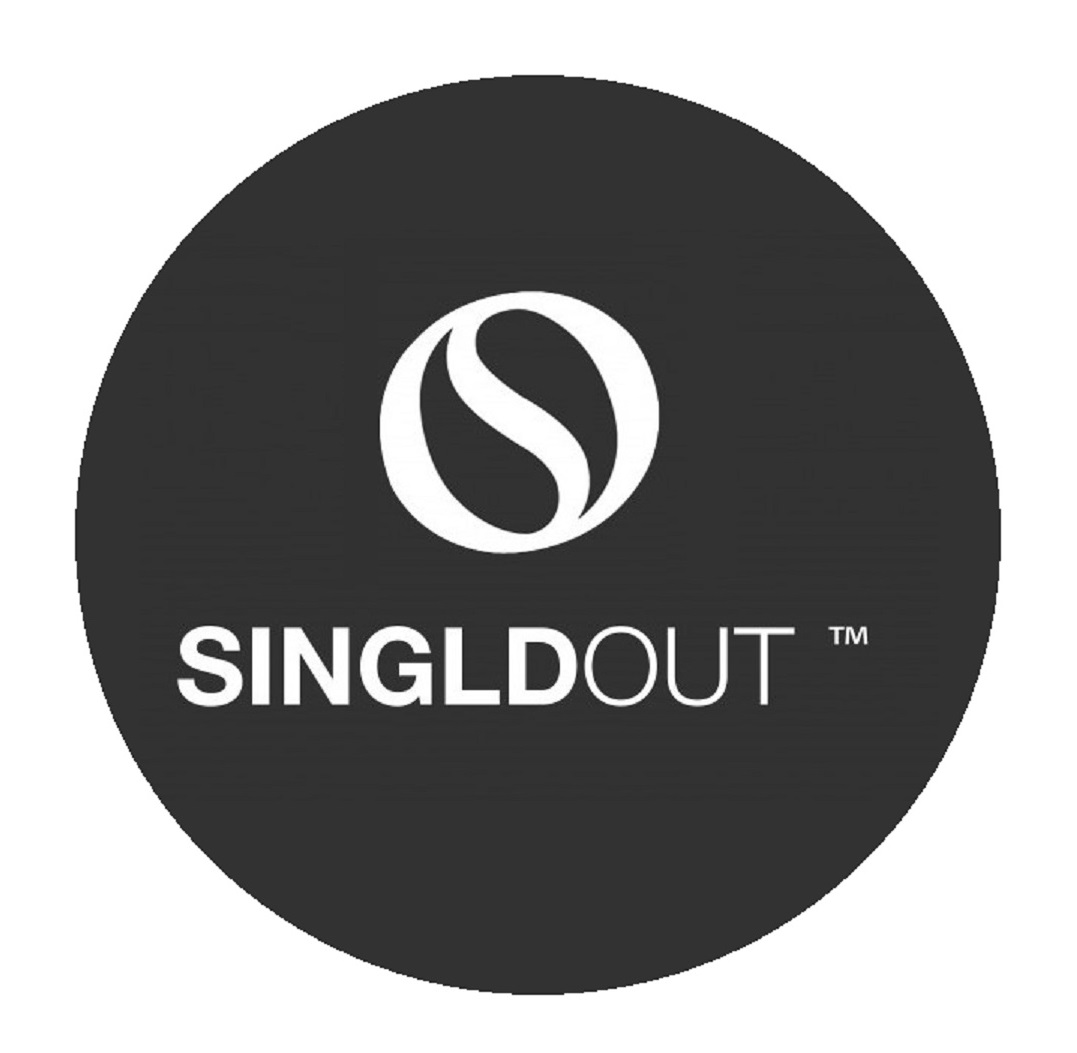
- Founded: California, December 2013
- Founders: Jana Bayad, Elle France

SingldOut was an online dating platform that claimed to use genetic testing to identify potential relationship matches. The company marketed its intention to bridge the gap between digital networking and biological compatibility. The service used the professional networking site LinkedIn as well as DNA testing company Instant Chemistry. Jana successfully wrote, orchestrated and implemented a highly targeted Public Relations campaign that resulted in national and international media acclaim valued at over $2M in earned media exposure. Jana Bayad launched the site in July 2014. It was shut down in November 2015.

== Methodology ==
Upon registering with SingldOut, members were sent a DNA test kit. To assess the biological compatibility of its members, SingldOut claimed to examine immune system genes, saying that they play a role in attraction, as well as serotonin transporter genes, claiming these play a role in determining how someone might react in certain situations. Results from the DNA test were then posted on the user's profile and compared with the results of other users.

The company credited genetic testing with the ability to “identify up to 40 percent of the chemistry of attraction between two people.”
